The Belgian Health Telematics Commission (BHTC) is a Belgian government committee working on standards for exchanging and sharing of health information, between health care participants. The committee provides advice on eHealth to the Belgian government. Professor Georges De Moor is head of the committee.

The BHTC consists of several working groups:
 Data
 Hospitals
 Telemedicine
 Label: homologation of (para)medical software

Georges De Moor, together with Jos Devlies and Geert Thienpont, authored the 2006 eHealth strategy and implementation activities in Belgium report.

See also
 Belgian Medical Informatics Association
 BeHealth
 FLOW
 KMEHR
 SumEHR
 HL7
 European Institute for Health Records
 ProRec
 EUDRANET

References

Sources
 Telematics Commission
 Rcommendations
 Telematics Standards in relation to the Health Sector (PDF, advice)

Health informatics organizations
Medical and health organisations based in Belgium